Michael Philip Wood (born 10 May 1980) is a New Zealand Labour Party politician and a member of the New Zealand House of Representatives, representing Mount Roskill. He is Minister of Transport, Minister of Immigration and Minister for Auckland in the Sixth Labour Government.

Early life
Wood was born in 1980. He attended Pakuranga College and graduated from the University of Auckland with a Bachelor of Arts in 2005. While a university student Wood worked as a Christmas tree salesman. After finishing university he initially worked in retail jobs for several years, including at Hugh Wright's, a men's clothing store. He joined the union movement, and worked as an organiser as a senior negotiator for the financial sector union Finance and Information Workers Union. He then joined Habitat for Humanity as an advisor working on several issues such as their health and safety procedures.

Labour Party activism and candidancy
In 1998, his first year at university, he became critical of the direction of New Zealand under the Fourth National Government, confirmed by that year's power crisis in Auckland. Wood reflected that the period was "a sign that things weren’t working well in our society." He joined Princes Street Labour and later took part in the Hikoi for Hope, a 1998 nationwide protest against inequality led by the Anglican Church of New Zealand.

Wood stood unsuccessfully for Labour in Pakuranga during the 2002 and 2005 elections and was on the Labour Party list in 2008. In 2010 he was elected to the Puketāpapa Local Board representing Roskill Community Voice, and was re-elected in 2013. He was the Labour candidate during the 2011 Botany by-election and in the 2014 election stood in Epsom.

After serving as the Mount Roskill Labour electorate chairman, in June 2016 he was selected as the Labour party's electorate candidate for the  following Phil Goff announcing he would instead contest the 2016 Auckland mayoralty election. Goff endorsed Wood as his successor.

Member of Parliament

First term, 2016–2017 
Following Goff's election to the Auckland mayoralty and resignation as a Member of Parliament in October 2016, Wood was confirmed as the candidate for the Mt Roskill by-election. Turnout was above average for a by-election, and Wood received more than twice as many votes as his closest rival, Parmjeet Parmar of the National Party.

On 16 December 2016, he was named as the Labour Party's spokesman on Consumer Affairs, Ethnic Communities, and Revenue. On 7 February 2017, the first sitting day of Parliament since his election, he took the House of Representatives' Oath of Allegiance and was appointed to the Finance and Expenditure Committee.

Sixth Labour Government 
During the 2017 New Zealand general election, Wood retained the Mount Roskill electorate, preserving his large majority. Wood was sworn in as Parliamentary Under-Secretary for Ethnic Communities following the formation of the Sixth Labour Government, and was additionally appointed as chair of the Finance and Expenditure Committee.

In a June 2019 reshuffle, Wood was promoted to Chief Government Whip, succeeding Ruth Dyson. Wood was a member of the Epidemic Response Committee, a select committee that considered the government's response to the COVID-19 pandemic.

During the 2020 New Zealand general election, Wood was re-elected in Mount Roskill by a final margin of 13,853 votes, defeating the National Party's candidate Parmjeet Parmar. Wood was promoted to cabinet following the 2020 election, becoming Minister of Transport, Minister for Workplace Relations and Safety, and Deputy Leader of the House.

In a cabinet reshuffle announced by Ardern on 13 June 2022, Wood was replaced as Deputy Leader of the House by Kieran McAnulty and took on the position of Minister of Immigration whilst retaining the Transport and Workplace Safety portfolios.

In early July 2022, Wood in his capacity as Immigration Minister stated that hospitality and tourism businesses needed to raise their wages in order to attract more foreign workers to New Zealand. His remarks were criticised by the ACT party candidate Chris Baillie, who accused him of attacking businesses. Wood defended his remarks, stating that he had spoken to hospitality and tourism workers. On 5 July, Wood defended the Government's decision to exclude nurses from its fast-track residency pathway on the ground that nurses left their profession after gaining residency status. The National Party's immigration spokesperson Erica Stanford criticised the exclusion of nurses as discriminatory and claimed that it worsened the country's shortage of nurses.

On 1 February 2023, Wood gained the additional portfolios of Minister for Auckland and Associate Minister of Finance.

Political positions
Wood was opposed to End of Life Choice and in favour of legalising recreational cannabis.

During the 2022 Wellington anti-vaccine mandate protest, Wood stated on 17 February there was a "river of filth" and claimed that anti-vaccine mandate protesters were motivated by violence, anti-Semitism, and Islamophobia. He also implored members of the centre-right National and ACT parties not to engage with the protesters.

Personal life

Wood is married to Julie Fairey, who was elected to the Auckland Council in 2022 as a councillor for the Albert-Eden-Puketāpapa ward. Wood and Fairey have a long history of being politically active; both having run campaigns as electorate MPs in the 2002 New Zealand general election. In 2010, Wood and Fairey were elected together as members of the Puketāpapa Local Board. Wood lives in Roskill South with his wife and their three sons. For several years he was the main caregiver for his children.

References

|-

|-

|-

1980 births
Living people
New Zealand Labour Party MPs
Unsuccessful candidates in the 2002 New Zealand general election
Unsuccessful candidates in the 2005 New Zealand general election
Unsuccessful candidates in the 2008 New Zealand general election
Unsuccessful candidates in the 2014 New Zealand general election
21st-century New Zealand politicians
Candidates in the 2017 New Zealand general election
New Zealand MPs for Auckland electorates
Candidates in the 2020 New Zealand general election
Members of the Cabinet of New Zealand